La Vega (officially San Juan de la Vega) is a municipality and town of Colombia in the department of Cundinamarca.

References

Municipalities of Cundinamarca Department
Pagina Alcaldía municipio de la vega https://www.lavega-cundinamarca.gov.co